Fonda 500 (aka F500 or Fonda500) are a British band hailing from Kingston upon Hull.

Background
Formed by Simon Stone and Nicholas Broten in 1995, Fonda 500 have been releasing albums since 2000. Their songs appeared on the soundtrack to the British comedy television programme, Teachers on Channel Four, Colin Farrel film Intermission and E4's Skins (2010). They have built up a cult following since 2000, chiefly through their explosive live performances and their unique musical style, which draws elements from 60's pop music (Beach Boys harmonies) bedroom pop (usage of novelty instruments) and indie rock (electric guitars). Their first two albums were released on Village Records (Hull), followed by a signing to Truck Records (Oxford) for No. 1 Hifi Hair.  Gentle Electric (Nottingham) released Spectrumatronicalogical Sounds and the ABCDELP. Their sixth album, Je m'appelle Stereo, was released on their own label Record mountain on 30 June 2008. After a recording hiatus during which the band continued to play live, 2014 saw the release of 8-Bit Sound System, a limited edition cassette which painstakingly rendered the entire of Eight Track Sound System into 8 bit.  After a hiatus in recording, in November 2015 the band released 4 new singles to be accompanied by a limited edition Christmasette in December. By 2018 the new album I Heart Fonda 500 was released by Record mountain, to be followed by the remix album "I Hate Fonda 500" in 2019.

Personnel
 Simon Stone
 Matt Edible
 Ian Appleyard
 Bod 
 Nicholas Broten

Discography

Albums
 Je m'appelle Stereo
 ABCDELP
 No.1 Hi-fi Hair
 Spectrumatronicalogical Sounds
 The Autumn/Winter Collection
 Eight Track Sound System 
 8 bit sound system
 heart fonda 500
 hate fonda 500

Singles
 "Super Chimpanzee"
 "8 Track"
 "I Like Nick Broten"
 "Computer Freaks Of The Galaxy"
 "Keybooooords belong to the animals"
 "Law of the Claw"
 "IamLove"
 "Greatest Living Sound"

External links
 Official site 
 Bandcamp
 Independent review Eight Track Sound System
 Independent live review
 NME live review
 NME review Eight Track Sound System
 Guardian live review
 Guardian/Observer Spectrumatronicalogical Sounds
 Guardian/Observer ABCDELP review
 SoundsXP review Je m'appelle Stereo
 Drowned in sound review
 BBC collective album review 
 Band interview
 Various pictures

English indie rock groups
Musical groups established in 1995
Musical groups from Kingston upon Hull
Low Transit Industries artists